Sphenella novaguineensis is a species of tephritid or fruit fly in the genus Sphenella of the family Tephritidae.

Distribution
New Guinea, New Britain.

References

Tephritinae
Insects described in 1988
Diptera of Australasia